The men's dual moguls at the 2017 Asian Winter Games was held on 24 February 2017 at Bankei Ski Area in Sapporo, Japan.

Schedule
All times are Japan Standard Time (UTC+09:00)

Results
Legend
DNF — Did not finish

Qualification

Knockout round

References

External links
Results at FIS website

Men's dual moguls